The 2012–13 Bayer Leverkusen season is the 109th season in the club's football history. In 2012–13, the club played in the Bundesliga, the top tier of German football. It was the club's 34th season in this league, having been promoted from the 2. Bundesliga in 1979.

The club also took part in the 2012–13 edition of the DFB-Pokal.

In Europe, the club had qualified for the 2012–13 edition of the UEFA Europa League where it played Metalist Kharkiv, Rapid Wien and Rosenborg in Group K of the group stage.

Review and events
In the 2011–12 season, Bayer Leverkusen finished fifth in the 2011–12 Bundesliga. Therefore, the club qualified for the 2012–13 Bundesliga, 2012–13 DFB-Pokal and 2012–13 Europa League.

Bayer Leverkusen rejected a bid for André Schürrle worth €25 million from Chelsea. Bayer Leverkusen has decided not to sell Schürrle because they were "unable to sign a replacement" because suitable replacements are "too expensive" and would be forced to sign "a weaker player" who is "overpriced". Leverkusen CEO Wolfgang Holzhäuser accused Bayern Munich coach of Jupp Heynckes "tapping up" Lars Bender. The club had rejected an "official" offer from Bayern Munich the previous week.

Matches

Legend

Bundesliga

League results and fixtures

League table

League summary table

DFB-Pokal

Europa League

Group stage

Group results

Group table

Group summary table

Knockout phase

Round of 32

Overall record

Squad information

Squad and statistics

Squad, appearances and goals

Sources:

|-
! colspan="12" style="background:#dcdcdc; text-align:center"| Goalkeepers

|-
! colspan="12" style="background:#dcdcdc; text-align:center"| Defenders

|-
! colspan="12" style="background:#dcdcdc; text-align:center"| Midfielders

|-
! colspan="12" style="background:#dcdcdc; text-align:center"| Forwards

|-
! colspan="12" style="background:#dcdcdc; text-align:center;"| No longer at the club

|}

Minutes played, goal scorers and scoring rate

Bookings

Transfers

In

Out
15	GK	 	René Adler	27	EU	Bayer Leverkusen	Transfer	Summer	2017	Free	[8]

Kits

Sources

Match reports

Other

External links
 2012–13 Bayer 04 Leverkusen season at Weltfussball.de 
 2012–13 Bayer 04 Leverkusen season at kicker.de 
 2012–13 Bayer 04 Leverkusen season at Fussballdaten.de 

Bayer Leverkusen
Bayer Leverkusen
Bayer 04 Leverkusen seasons